Ophelia's Shadow is the fourth solo studio album by the British singer Toyah Willcox, released in 1991 by E.G. Records. Some musicians playing on this album have been members of King Crimson at a certain moment, people like Robert Fripp, Gordon Haskell, Keith Tippett and Trey Gunn.

Background
The album was created with Tony Geballe as well as Trey Gunn and Paul Beavis with whom Toyah and her husband Robert Fripp constituted the band Sunday All Over the World at the same time. It was originally planned as part two of a trilogy, following Prostitute. The title is a reference to Ophelia, a character from William Shakespeare's Hamlet, and Carl Jung's psychological concept of the shadow.

In 2003, the album was reissued via Toyah's own Vertical Species label with a slightly changed artwork and new text introduction. In 2020, it was released as part of the Toyah Solo box set.

Track listing
 "Ophelia's Shadow" (Trey Gunn, Toyah Willcox, Tony Geballe, Paul Beavis) – 5:54
 "The Shaman Says" (Geballe, Willcox) – 5:23
 "Brilliant Day" (Willcox, Robert Fripp, Gunn, Beavis) – 2:39
 "Prospect" (Geballe, Willcox) – 3:13
 "Turning Tide" (Geballe, Willcox) – 5:40
 "Take What You Will" (Beavis, Geballe, Gunn, Willcox) – 5:42
 "Ghost Light" (Gunn, Willcox, Geballe, Beavis) – 4:28
 "The Woman Who Had an Affair with Herself" (Geballe, Willcox) – 4:17
 "Homeward" (Geballe, Willcox) – 5:16
 "Lords of the Never Known" (Willcox, Fripp, Gunn, Beavis) – 4:32

Personnel
Toyah Willcox – vocals, producer, engineer, mixing
Tony Geballe – guitar, computer, engineer
Trey Gunn – stick, keyboards, engineer
Paul Beavis – drums, percussion

Additional musicians
Robert Fripp – guitar on tracks 3 and 10 (uncredited), mixing
Keith Tippett – keyboards on track 10
Gordon Haskell – keyboard intro on track 1

Production
Tony Arnold – backing tracks producer, engineer

References

External links
 Official audio stream on YouTube
 The official Toyah website

1991 albums
Toyah Willcox albums
E.G. Records albums